Ye Meri Life Hai is a Hindi TV serial that aired on Sony Entertainment Television. The story reflects the aspirations and dreams of today's youth, as they battle it out with conventions and norms to carve their own niche in the world. The screenplay and dialogues of the initial episodes were penned by Arif Ali and Sanyukta Chaudhuri.

Plot
The story revolves around a young girl named Pooja who hails from a conservative middle-class Gujarati household in Mumbai. Pooja dreams of becoming a successful film director and idolises Karan Johar.

To realise her dream, Pooja secretly joins a coveted film studies course at the trendy St. Martin's College, keeping her father in the dark. At the college, the simple and straightforward Pooja instantly comes face to face with the hip and high-class students of St. Martins's and is made intensely aware of her middle-class looks and attitude. She is ill-treated by the well-to-do English speaking students who label her as 'vernacular' as she speaks in her Gujarati tone and accent. The story revolves around her college life as she gradually wins over her classmates, makes new friends and successfully completes her course.

Later, the story shifts to Pooja's life after college as she starts the new chapter in her life as an independent working woman. Her sister, Poornima falls in love with and marries Ronit. Young and rich businessman Ashmit woos Pooja and they get married. Pooja soon discovers that Ashmit, supposedly Ronit's step-brother, is in fact an impostor who kills Poornima to keep his secret safe. Eventually, Ashmit is arrested and is sent to prison.

A broken and dejected Pooja is encouraged by Ronit to regroup herself and to continue her journey of accomplishing her goal of becoming a film director. Pooja finally finishes her first film. At the premier, Ronit proposes to her and she happily accepts.

Cast 

 Shama Sikander as Pooja
 Rahil Azam as Ashmit Malhotra
 Muskaan Mihani as Mandeep "Mandy", Pooja's best friend
 Amit Jain as Ronit
 Simple Kaul as Reema
 Toasty Joshi / Aparna Tarakad as Annie
 Manoj Joshi as Rasik, Pooja's father
 Vandana Pathak as Pooja's mother
 Shital Thakkar as Poornima, Pooja's sister
 Kishori Godbole as Prerna
 Tanaaz Currim as Jayshree
 Sudhanshu Pandey as Professor Bikram Roy
 Shweta Kawatra as Shweta Kawatra
 Kavita Kaushik as Annie
 Smita Bansal as Poornima, Pooja's sister
 Sumeet Sachdev as Jatin
 Ajay Arya as Akash
 Krutika Desai Khan as Ronit's mother
 Salil Acharya as Kushaan
 Sujata Mehta as Ronit's mother
 Abhijit Kelkar as Poornima's boyfriend and father of her child
 Manmeet Singh as Mandy's father
 Mihir Mishra as Gautam
 Gurmeet Choudhary as Gurmeet
 Nishigandha Wad
 Amit Singh
 Nikhil Yadav

External links
Ye Meri Life Hai Official Site on Sony TV

2004 Indian television series debuts
2005 Indian television series endings
Indian television series
Sony Entertainment Television original programming
Television series by Optimystix Entertainment